William Coolidge may refer to:
 William D. Coolidge (1873–1975), American physicist
 W. A. B. Coolidge (William Augustus Brevoort Coolidge, 1850–1926), American historian, theologist, and mountaineer